Gábor Köves (born 7 January 1970) is a retired Hungarian Olympian tennis player. Seoul gold medalists Ken Flach and Robert Seguso stopped him and partner László Markovits in the second round in the 1988 Summer Olympics.

Gabor Köves is currently the captain of the Hungary Davis Cup team since December 2016 when Zoltán Kuhárszky stepped down due to conflict of interest, because he became Máté Valkusz's personal coach who is a member of the Hungarian Davis Cup team.

Titles

Doubles (4)

References

External links
 
 
 

1970 births
Living people
Hungarian male tennis players
Tennis players at the 1988 Summer Olympics
Tennis players at the 1996 Summer Olympics
Tennis players at the 2000 Summer Olympics
Olympic tennis players of Hungary
Tennis players from Budapest
20th-century Hungarian people
21st-century Hungarian people